The Northwestern Wildcats men's soccer team is a varsity intercollegiate athletic team of Northwestern University in Evanston, Illinois, United States. The team is a member of the Big Ten Conference, which is part of the National Collegiate Athletic Association's Division I. Northwestern's first men's soccer team was fielded in 1980. The team plays its home games at Martin Stadium in Evanston, which opened in 2016. The Cats are coached by Russell Payne.

Current squad

Coaching Staff 
 Head coach: Russell Payne
 Associate Head Coach: Krystian Witkowski
 Assistant coach: Ricardo Pinto
 Volunteer Assistant Coach: Jonathan Bornstein
 Director of Operations: Aziz Tahir

Former coaches

References

External links 
 

 
1980 establishments in Illinois